Krzykawka  is a village in the administrative district of Gmina Bolesław, within Olkusz County, Lesser Poland Voivodeship, in southern Poland.

The village has a population of 830.

During the January Uprising, on May 5, 1863, the Battle of Krzykawka was fought near the village between Polish insurgents supported by Italian and French volunteers and Russian troops. Italian commander Francesco Nullo, hero of Italian and Polish independence fights, died in the battle, and there is a monument dedicated to him in the village.

References

External links
 Jewish Community in Krzykawka on Virtual Shtetl

Villages in Olkusz County